Kim Un-sol (born May 7, 1998) is a North Korean female acrobatic gymnast. With partners Ri Hyang and Ri Jin-hwa, Kim achieved 4th in the 2014 Acrobatic Gymnastics World Championships.

References

External links

 

1998 births
Living people
North Korean acrobatic gymnasts
Female acrobatic gymnasts